Segger Microcontroller, founded in 1992, is a private company involved in the embedded systems industry. It provides products used to develop and manufacture four categories of embedded systems: real-time operating systems (RTOS) and software libraries (middleware), debugging and trace probes, programming tools (integrated development environment (IDE), compiler, linker), and in-system programmers (Flasher line of products). The company is headquartered in Monheim am Rhein, Germany, with remote offices in Gardner, Massachusetts; Milpitas, California; and Shanghai, China.

History
Segger Microcontroller was founded in 1992 by Rolf Segger in Hilden, Germany. The first product was the real-time operating system (RTOS), now named embOS. It was followed by emWin two years later. Initial products focused on RTOS and middleware products. However, the company later produced ISP-programming tools (Flasher) and debug probes (J-Link). In 2015, Segger introduced Embedded Studio, their cross-platform IDE for central processing units conforming to the ARM architecture, though recent versions are also used by RISC-V. All products are developed, maintained and updated in Germany except for Embedded Studio, which is primarily developed by a team of developers in the United Kingdom.

Product categories

Debug and trace probes

J-Link 

Segger is most noted for its J-Link family, which supports JTAG (Joint Test Action Group) and SWD (Serial Wire Debug) debug probes for microcontrollers that have older ARM cores (ARM7, ARM9, ARM11), ARM Cortex-M cores (M0, M0+, M1, M3, M4, M7, M23, M33, M85), ARM Cortex-R cores (R4, R5, R8), ARM Cortex-A cores (A5, A7, A8, A9, A12, A15, A17, A53, A72), Renesas RX, Microchip PIC32, SiLab EFM8, RISC-V. It is also repackaged and sold as an OEM item by Analog Devices as the mIDASLink, Atmel as the SAM-ICE, Digi International as the Digi JTAG Link, and IAR Systems as the J-Link and the J-Link KS. This is the only JTAG emulator that can add Segger's patented flash breakpoint software to a debugger to enable the setting of multiple breakpoints in flash while running on an ARM device which is typically hindered by the limited availability of hardware breakpoints.

 Note: Further models are J-Link LITE ARM, J-Link LITE CortexM, J-Link LITE RX, J-Link OB, J-Link OEM.
 Note: PLUS, BASE, EDU models are physically the same hardware. There are differences in license and software options, such as GDB Server, Flash Download, Unlimited Flash Breakpoints, J-Flash, RDI, RDDI.
 Note: The EDU & EDU Mini models cannot be used for commercial software development, also doesn't have J-Flash, J-Flash SPI, RDI, RDDI features.
 Note: Adapters and isolators are available to convert the 20-pin 0.1"/2.54mm male shrouded (box) header to another target board connector.

See also
 Embedded system
 Single-board microcontroller
 List of ARM microprocessor cores
 GNU Debugger

References

External links

 

German companies established in 1992
Companies based in North Rhine-Westphalia